Oloyede is a Nigerian name.

Family name 
 Bimbo Oloyede, veteran Nigerian TV journalist and producer.
 Is-haq Oloyede (born 1954), professor of Islamic Studies, former Vice Chancellor of the University of Ilorin, Nigeria.
 Mufutau Oloyede Abdul-Rahmon, Nigerian professor of Arabic and Islamic Studies.

First name 
 Oloyede Adeyeoba, traditional ruler of the Okeluse kingdom, in Ondo State, Nigeria.